Michele Regina Hanson (September 13, 1942 – March 2, 2018) was a British writer and a columnist for The Guardian. Hanson's nickname for her daughter was used for her character, Treasure, who originated in her Guardian column and appeared in two books, Treasure: The Trials of a Teenage Terror (1993) and What Treasure Did Next (1996). These were the basis for the animated TV series Treasure.

Bibliography 
  (as Gina Davidson)
  (as Gina Davidson)

References 

1942 births
2018 deaths
20th-century British women writers
21st-century British women writers
British women columnists
The Guardian journalists
Writers from London